The List of Human stampedes in Hindu Temples / Holy Places in India includes:

See also
 List of largest Hindu temples
 List of tallest Gopurams
 List of large temple tanks
 Lists of Hindu temples by country

References 

 
Hinduism-related lists
Hindu temples
Human stampedes in Hindu temples
Human stampedes